New Hope Bridge, also known as Bartholomew County Bridge No. 133, is a historic Pratt through truss bridge spanning the Flatrock River at Columbus Township, Bartholomew County, Indiana. It was designed by the Caldwell & Drake ironworks and built in 1913.  It consists of two spans, with each measuring 128 feet long. It rests on concrete abutments and a concrete pier.

The bridge is open to single-lane traffic along 400N in Bartholomew County which spans from U.S. Route 31 just north of Columbus, Indiana to Columbus Municipal Airport, the former site of Bakalar Air Force Base. Because portions of 400N are low-lying the road and bridge are occasionally closed due to high water from the Flat Rock River.

New Hope Bridge was listed on the National Register of Historic Places in 1999.

References

Road bridges on the National Register of Historic Places in Indiana
Bridges completed in 1913
Transportation buildings and structures in Bartholomew County, Indiana
National Register of Historic Places in Bartholomew County, Indiana
1913 establishments in Indiana
Pratt truss bridges in the United States
Metal bridges in the United States